Cross's beaked snake (Letheobia crossii) is a species of snake in the family Typhlopidae. The species is native to West Africa.

Etymology
The specific name, crossii, is in honor of British explorer William Henry Crosse (1859–1903).

Geographic range
L. crossii is found in Nigeria and Togo.

Habitat
The preferred natural habitat of L. crossii is forest.

Reproduction
L. crossii is oviparous.

References

Further reading
Boulenger GA (1893). Catalogue of the Snakes in the British Museum (Natural History). Volume I., Containing the Families Typhlopidæ, Glauconiidæ, Boidæ, Ilysiidæ, Uropeltidæ, Xenopeltidæ, and Colubridæ Aglyphæ, part. London: Trustees of the British Museum (Natural History). (Taylor and Francis, printers). xiii + 448 pp. + Plates I-XXVIII. (Typhlops crossii, new species, p. 52 + Plate III, Figures 5a, 5b, 5c).
Boulenger GA (1895). "On some new or little-known Reptiles obtained by W.H. Crosse, Esq., on the Niger". Annals and Magazine of Natural History, Sixth Series 16: 32–34. (Typhlops crossii, p. 33).
Broadley DG, Wallach V (2007). "A review of East and Central African species of Letheobia Cope, revived from the synonymy of Rhinotyphlops Fitzinger, with descriptions of five new species (Serpentes: Typhlopidae). Zootaxa 1515: 31-68. (Letheobia crossii, new combination).
Roux-Estève R (1974). "Révision systématique des Typhlopidae d'Afrique, Reptilia-Serpentes ". Memoires du Museum National d'Histoire Naturelle Nouvelle Serie - Serie A, Zoologie 87: 1-313. (Rhinotyphlops crossii, new combination). (in French).

Letheobia
Reptiles described in 1893